The Altai wapiti, sometimes called the Altai elk, is a subspecies of Cervus canadensis found in the forest hills of southern Siberia, northwestern Mongolia, and northern Xinjiang province of China. It is different from the Tian Shan wapiti in being smaller and paler in color.

It has also been classified as C. elaphus sibirica, and is also known as the Altai maral, central maral deer, Siberian red deer, and maral.

References 

Elk and red deer